Year of the Dragon is a 1985 American neo-noir crime thriller film directed by Michael Cimino and starring Mickey Rourke, Ariane Koizumi and John Lone. The screenplay was written by Cimino and Oliver Stone and adapted from the novel by Robert Daley.

Cimino's first film after the box office failure of Heaven's Gate (1980), Year of the Dragon is a New York crime drama and an exploration of gangs, the illegal drug trade, ethnicity, racism, and stereotypes. Despite mixed reviews and being a box office flop, it has gained a cult following in the years since its release.

Plot
Stanley White is New York's most decorated police captain and a Vietnam War veteran assigned to New York City's Chinatown, where he makes it a personal mission to crack down on Chinese organized crime. He is obsessed with his career and neglects his marriage to his wife Connie.

White comes into conflict with Joey Tai, a young man who ruthlessly rises to become the head of the Chinese Triad societies, and as a result of his ambition, creates a high profile for himself and the Triads' activities. Together, they end the uneasy truce that has existed between the Triads and the police precinct, even as they conduct a personal war between themselves and the Italian Mob and Thai gangsters who have traditionally been involved in their heroin supply chain.

The married captain also becomes romantically involved with Tracy Tzu, a television reporter, who comes under brutal attack from the criminals, as does White's long-suffering wife. This makes him even more determined to destroy the triads, and especially Joey Tai.

White also hires an up-and-coming Chinese rookie cop, Herbert, to go undercover as one of Tai's restaurant workers. Herbert manages to get inside information on a drug shipment but is betrayed by corrupt cop Alan Perez and loses his life when Tai is informed by Perez that Herbert is a cop. Now that Tai has raped Tracy, killed his wife and Herbert, White wastes no time in confronting Tai just as the shipment comes in.

At the harbor, Tai and his bodyguard are on their way to the shipment when White attempts to arrest them. Perez drives by yelling abuse, White shoots and kills Perez but Tai draws a gun and shoots White in the hand, accidentally killing his bodyguard. Tai flees on a train bridge. This leads to a showdown where White and Tai run at each other while firing recklessly. White shoots Tai, leaving him wounded in both legs. Rather than suffer, and losing face, Tai asks for White's gun in order to commit suicide. He kills himself in front of White.

The final scene shows White and Tracy coming together in the streets of Chinatown at Tai's funeral.

Cast

Production

Pre-production
Michael Cimino was approached many times to helm an adaptation of Robert Daley's novel, but consistently turned the opportunity down. When he finally agreed, Cimino realized he was unable to write and direct in the time allotted; The producers already had an approximate start date for the film. He brought in Oliver Stone, who he had met through his producer and friend Joann Carelli, to help him write the script.

Cimino was prompted to seek out Stone after reading, and being impressed by, Stone's (at the time) unproduced Platoon screenplay. Cimino asked Stone to work on Year of the Dragon for a lower-than-normal wage as part of a quid pro quo deal, namely, that Year of the Dragon producer Dino De Laurentiis would help in finding the funding for Stone to make Platoon. Stone agreed to this deal.

"With Michael, it's a 24-hour day", said Stone. "He doesn't really sleep ... he's truly an obsessive personality. He's the most Napoleonic director I ever worked with". Cimino did a year and a half of research on the project.

While De Laurentiis gave director Cimino final cut in his contract, De Laurentiis also sent Cimino a side letter that said, notwithstanding the contract, he would not have final cut. This information was revealed when the producers of The Sicilian sued Cimino over the length of that film.

Casting
Because the production was moving so fast, casting began before the script was completed. Originally, Stone and Cimino had either Nick Nolte or Jeff Bridges in mind for the role of Stanley White, but after seeing Mickey Rourke in The Pope of Greenwich Village and working with him on Heaven's Gate, Cimino changed his mind. According to Rourke, the difficulty with playing White was making himself appear 15 years older to suit the character. Cimino drew heavily on the real-life boxing prowess of Rourke. At first, Rourke did not take his physical training seriously, so Cimino hired Hells Angels member Chuck Zito to be Rourke's instructor. Rourke has often quoted in many interviews that he loved working with Cimino despite the disapproved reputation he earned himself over the years since his previous box office failures, quoting, "He was a ball of fire. I hadn't seen anyone quite like him".

Rourke was paid $1 million to star in the film.

Shooting
As with Streets of Fire, most of the film was shot not on location but on soundstages in Wilmington, North Carolina, after meticulous research of various locales which could be passed off as Chinatown and/or East Asia. The sets proved realistic enough to fool even Stanley Kubrick, who attended the movie's premiere. Cimino actually had to convince the Bronx-born Kubrick that the film's exteriors were shot on the DEG backlot, and not on location.

Other cities used in filming included New York City, Toronto, Vancouver, Victoria, Bangkok and Shangirey. Cimino said he often liked to shoot in different cities, with interiors in one city and exteriors in another. In one scene, Joey Tai and his lawyer walk through a Chinese textile mill, past a guard-rail and into a shoddy apartment building to meet up with two of his assassins. The textile mill was in Bangkok, the guard-rail was in New York and the apartment building was in Wilmington. When one of the script supervisors commented that the scene "wouldn't cut" (edit seamlessly together), Cimino bet her $1,000 that it would. Upon seeing the cut, the script supervisor conceded and Cimino won the bet but refused to take the $1,000.

Unlike Heaven's Gate, Cimino was able to bring the film in on time and on budget.

Post-production
At the end of the film, White's final line is "You were right and I was wrong. I'd like to be a nice guy. But I just don't know how to be nice". According to Cimino, the final line of White was supposed to be "Well, I guess if you fight a war long enough, you end up marrying the enemy". The studio vetoed the original line, written by Stone. Cimino feels that either the studio or the producers thought the original line was politically incorrect.

Release
The film opened at #5 on the box office charts, grossing $4,039,079 in 982 theaters on its opening weekend of August 16, 1985. It opened to decent business in major American cities including Washington, D.C., Detroit, and Pittsburgh, but the draw soon dropped, which was perceived to be the result of protest against it from Asian American groups (see below). Year of the Dragon was a box office flop, costing $24 million but grossing only $18 million through its run.

Reception
Year of the Dragon received polarized reviews upon its release in 1985. Vincent Canby wrote for The New York Times: "Year of the Dragon is light years away from being a classic, but then it makes no pretense at being anything more than what it is — an elaborately produced gangster film that isn't boring for a minute, composed of excesses in behavior, language and visual effects that, eventually, exert their own hypnotic effect." Janet Maslin, in contrast, also writing for The New York Times, deplored a lack of "feeling, reason and narrative continuity", under which the actors fared "particularly badly", especially Ariane Koizumi whose role in the movie was "ineffectual".

Rex Reed of the New York Post gave Dragon one of its most ecstatic reviews: "Exciting, explosive, daring and adventurous stuff." In his review of Cimino's later film The Sicilian, Roger Ebert of the Chicago Sun-Times wrote that Year of the Dragon was "strongly plotted and moved along with power and efficiency." Leonard Maltin gave the film two and a half stars, calling it a "Highly charged, arresting melodrama ... but nearly drowns in a sea of excess and self-importance." Pauline Kael of The New Yorker dismissed the film as "hysterical, rabble rousing pulp, the kind that goes over well with subliterate audiences."

The film has a 56% "rotten" rating on Rotten Tomatoes from 18 reviews, with a weighted average of 6.08/10.

Top Ten lists
3rd  (in 1985)  – Cahiers du Cinéma

Legacy
Quentin Tarantino has praised this film as one of his favorites, naming its climactic train tracks shoot-out as one of his favorite "Killer Movie Moments" in 2004, remarking, "You forget to breathe during it!".

Melanie Chisholm from the Spice Girls is shown in the music video for their 1997 single "Too Much" singing in a Chinatown, dressed in a red cheongsam; this scene is based upon the film.

There is a Carpenter Brut song titled "Looking For Tracy Tzu", in an apparent reference to the character of the same name.

This film was also the first instance of the Desert Eagle pistol, used by Rourke's character, in a motion picture.

Controversy
Members of the Chinese American and Asian American communities protested against the film, criticizing the film for its racial stereotyping, widespread xenophobia, and use of slurs (especially the use of the derogatory terms "chinks", "slant-eyed", and "yellow niggers"), and sexism. Some groups worried that the film would make Chinatown unsafe and cause an economic downturn in the community. As a result of the controversy, a disclaimer was attached to its opening credits, which read:

This film does not intend to demean or to ignore the many positive features of Asian Americans and specifically Chinese American communities. Any similarity between the depiction in this film and any association, organization, individual or Chinatown that exists in real life is accidental.

In her negative review, Pauline Kael added, "Year of the Dragon isn't much more xenophobic than The Deer Hunter was, but it's a lot flabbier; the scenes have no tautness, no definition, and so you're more likely to be conscious of the bigotry."

Director Cimino responded to the controversy in an interview in Jeune cinéma:

The film was accused of racism, but they didn't pay attention to what people say in the film. It's a film which deals with racism, but it's not a racist film. To deal with this sort of subject, you must inevitably reveal its tendencies. It's the first time that we deal with the marginalization which the Chinese were subject to. On that subject, people know far too little. Americans discover with surprise that the Chinese were excluded from American citizenship up until 1943. They couldn't bring their wives to America. Kwong's speech to Stanley is applauded. For all these reasons, the Chinese love the film. And the journalists' negative reactions are perhaps a shield to conceal these unpleasant facts.

Awards
The film was nominated for a Best Foreign Film (Meilleur film étranger) César Award. John Lone received a Best Supporting Actor Golden Globe nomination and David Mansfield received a Best Original Score nod.

The film was nominated for five Razzie Awards, including Worst Screenplay, Worst Picture, Worst Director, Worst Actress and Worst New Star (both for Ariane).

References

Annotations

Footnotes

Bibliography
 Kael, Pauline (1989). "The Great White Hope". Hooked. New York: E.P Dutton. pp. 31–38. .

Further reading
 Chevrie, Marc (November 1985). "Le point de mire" (in French). Cahiers du Cinéma (n377).
 Marchetti, Gina (1993). "Conclusion: The Postmodern Spectacle of Race and Romance in 'Year of the Dragon'". Romance and the "Yellow Peril": Race, Sex, and Discursive Strategies in Hollywood Fiction. Berkeley, California: University of California Press.
 Marchetti, Gina (1991). "Ethnicity, the Cinema and Cultural Studies". Unspeakable Images: Ethnicity and the American Cinema. Urbana, Illinois: University of Illinois Press.
 Masson, Alain (November 1985). "L'année du dragon" (in French). Positif (n297).
 Pym, John (December/January 1985–86). "After the Deluge". Sight and Sound (55).
 Toubiana, Serge (December 1985). "Il n'y a pas d'affaire Cimino" (in French). Cahiers du Cinéma (n378).
 Wood, Robin (Summer/Fall 1986). "Hero/Anti-Hero: The Dilemma of 'Year of the Dragon'". CineAction! (n6).

External links
 
 
 
 Year of the Dragon at michaelcimino.fr (unofficial French website)
 Trailer of Year of the Dragon on YouTube
 Excerpt: The Shootout from Year of the Dragon on YouTube
 Film review  by John J. Puccio at DVD Town
 Film review  at eFilmCritic.com

1985 films
1980s crime thriller films
1985 action thriller films
American action thriller films
American neo-noir films
American police detective films
Films about Chinese Americans
Fictional portrayals of the New York City Police Department
Films about the New York City Police Department
Films directed by Michael Cimino
Films produced by Dino De Laurentiis
Films scored by David Mansfield
Films with screenplays by Oliver Stone
Films set in New York City
Films shot in New York City
Films shot in North Carolina
Films shot in Thailand
Films shot in Vancouver
Metro-Goldwyn-Mayer films
Triad films
Chinese-language American films
1980s English-language films
1980s American films